The prosecutor-general of Iran (or attorney-general), in the judicial system of Iran, is a "just mujtahid" appointed by the head of the judiciary in consultation with the judges of the Supreme Court to serve for a period of five years.

The head of the prosecutor-general's office, he supervises prosecutor's offices in the country. As head of the public prosecution for the state, he has executive responsibility for law enforcement, prosecutions, setting priorities in the hearings of cases.

List of recent prosecutors-general

See also
Judicial system of Iran

References 

Judiciary of Iran
Iranian prosecutors
Shia clerics
Law of Iran